Sarah Dooley is an American comedian, singer, songwriter, and performer located in New York City.

She is a 2011 graduate of Barnard College, where she received attention across the Columbia University campus both for her musical performances as well as her comedy Web series called "And Sarah". It was this web series that brought broader attention to her work when Ian Ayres wrote about it on his blog Freakonomics.

Her album Stupid Things was released in February 2014.

Her cover of the George Gershwin song, "But Not for Me", was featured in the first episode of the second season of the CBS All Access show, The Good Fight.

Her debut book, Are You My Uber?, a parody of P.D. Eastman's Are You My Mother?, was published on October 29, 2019, by Running Press.

References

External links
  Sarah Dooley

Year of birth missing (living people)
Living people
Singers from New York City
Barnard College alumni
American women pop singers
American women comedians
Comedians from New York City
Songwriters from New York (state)
21st-century American women